Death Road may refer to:

Yungas Road, a notoriously treacherous route in Bolivia
Kabul–Behsud Highway, a highway in Afghanistan noted for its frequency of Taliban-related killings